Engilbert of Saint Gall may refer to:

Engilbert I of Saint Gall (abbot 840/841)
Engilbert II of Saint Gall (abbot 925–933)